Shahrak-e Ahmadiyeh is a village in Qotbabad Rural District, Kordian District, Jahrom County, Fars Province, Iran. At the 2016 census, its population was 47, in 23 families.

References 

Populated places in Jahrom County